R.W. Harrison HPER Complex is a 5,000-seat multi-purpose arena in Itta Bena, Mississippi. Constructed in 1977, it is home to the Mississippi Valley State University Delta Devils basketball and volleyball teams. 

In 2016, $17.5 million worth of upgrades were completed to further modernize the facility and add technology classrooms.

Gallery

See also
 List of NCAA Division I basketball arenas

References

 

College basketball venues in the United States
Basketball venues in Mississippi
Buildings and structures in Leflore County, Mississippi
Mississippi Valley State Delta Devils basketball
Sports venues completed in 1977
1977 establishments in Mississippi
College volleyball venues in the United States